Volcani may refer to:

Benjamin Elazari Volcani
Volcani Institute, or Agricultural Research Organization, Volcani Center
Area Volcani in the Vulcanal precinct